The 1940 Manchester Exchange by-election was held on 21 September 1940.  The by-election was held due to the death  of the incumbent Conservative MP, Peter Eckersley.  It was won by the Conservative candidate Thomas Hewlett.

References

Manchester Exchange by-election
Manchester Exchange by-election
1940s in Manchester
Manchester Exchange by-election
Exchange
Unopposed by-elections to the Parliament of the United Kingdom (need citation)